Kawasaki is a brand of bicycle produced by various manufacturers from time to time since the 1970s. The bicycle types have included BMX, mountain, fatbikes, and e-bikes. Manufacturers have included Huffy, CGF Factory, and Diavelo. Promotion of the Kawasaki BMX brand included sponsoring BMX racing.

BMX
Kawasaki BMX bicycles were welded by Triple-A Accessories in southern California in the 1970s. Frames were made from steel and aluminum with TIG and MIG welders. The frames had a rear suspension consisting of a swingarm supported by a spring on each side. The front fork was attached to the frame by a triple clamp but was not telescopic, even though the bottom of the stanchions were covered by a boots to give the appearance of being telescopic. The bikes had banana-style seats and BMX-style handlebars.

MTB
Kawasaki mountain bikes were sold at Kawasaki motorcycle dealerships in the 1990s. The 1994 KMB 450 model had a rigid steel rear frame and telescoping forks with elastomers.

In 2018, a 34-lb, full-suspension mountain bike with 26-inch wheels and a front disc brake was offered under the Kawasaki brand name.

See also 
Kawasaki motorcycles
David Clinton

External links 
 Project Kawasaki BX200 Pro Series
 Kawasaki at the BMX Museum
 Kawasaki Mountain Bike Ads

References 

Japanese brands